During the 2004–05 Dutch football season, PSV Eindhoven competed in the Eredivisie.

Season summary
Despite losing several key players in the summer, PSV reached the semi-finals of the Champions League before being knocked out by eventual runners-up Milan. PSV won the home leg 3–1, but lost 2–0 at the San Siro, Milan advancing on away goals.

Players

First-team squad
Squad at end of season

Left club during season

Starting 11
Considering starts in all competitions

Transfers

In
  Robert –  Atlas – January, £2,000,000

Out
  Arjen Robben –  Chelsea – €18,000,000 (£12,100,000)
  Dennis Rommedahl –  Charlton Athletic
  Mateja Kežman –  Chelsea – 13 July, £5,300,000
  Jurgen Colin –  NAC Breda
  Adil Ramzi –  AZ
  Jasar Takak –  RKC Waalwijk, loan
  Arvid Smit –  Willem II, loan
  Michael Jakobsen –  Aalborg BK, February
  Otman Bakkal –  Den Bosch, loan

References

PSV Eindhoven seasons
Psv Eindhoven
Dutch football championship-winning seasons